Bignona Department is one of the three departments in the Ziguinchor Region of Senegal.

Districts
Within the department are three urban communes: Bignona, Thionck Essyl and Diouloulou

The rest of the department is divided administratively into four arrondissements made up of rural districts (communautés rurales):
  
 Kataba Arrondissement (renamed from Diouloulou in 2008, when Diouloulou became a commune)
 Kataba
 Djinaky
 Kafoutine
 Sindian Arrondissement:
 Djibidione
 Oulampane
 
 
 Tendouck Arrondissement:
 Balinghor
 
 
 
 Mlomp
 Tenghory Arrondissement:
 Coubalan
 
 Ouonck

Historic sites 

 Mausoleum of Ahoune Sané, Koundioughor, Sindian Arrondissement
 100 year old Sindian Fromager (Kapok) tree, a place of worship for the rites of initiation
 Bakolon Badji site at Niankite, a place of worship for the rites of initiation
 Sweetwater wells at Kafountine, Arrondissement of Kataba
 Palm Baobab of Baligname
 Nankoray termite colony at Djilondine, place of worship for the animist priestesses

References

 
Departments of Senegal
Ziguinchor Region